The following radio stations broadcast on FM frequency 92.1 MHz:

Argentina
 Bella Vista in Bella Vista, Corrientes
 Cadena 3 Villa Mercedes in Villa Mercedes, San Luis
 Cielo in Salta
 Concierto in San Genaro, Santa Fe
 Estación Serrano in Serrano, Córdoba
 Frecuencia 92 in Villa de Soto, Córdoba
 LRP442 de la ciudad in Pigüé, Buenos Aires
 La Voz del Cerro in San Salvador de Jujuy, Jujuy
 La 100 San Nicolás in San Nicolás de los Arroyos, Buenos Aires
 Libertad in Victoria, Entre Rìos
 LRA 10 Radio Nacional Ushuaia in Ushuaia, Tierra del Fuego
 LRI 402 Monumental in Alcorta, Santa Fe
 Me gusta in Cipolletti, Río Negro
 Radio María in Mar del Plata, Buenos Aires
 Radio María in Carlos Casares, Buenos Aires
 Radio María in Arrecifes, Buenos Aires
 Radio María in Trenque Lauquen, Buenos Aires
 Radio María in Villa Dolores, Córdoba
 Radio María in Villa Huidobro, Córdoba
 Radio María in Nogoyá, Entre Ríos
 Radio María in Villa Aberastain - La Rinconada, San Juan
 Radio María in San Vicente, Misiones
 Radio María in Cafayate, Salta 
 Radio María in Rufino, Santa Fe
 Red 92 in La Plata, Buenos Aires
 Tiempo in Santa Teresita, Buenos Aires
 Tu Lugar in Playa Unión, Chubut
 Uno in Tres Arroyos, Buenos Aires
 Vorterix Rock in Buenos Aires
 XLW in San Luis

Australia
 2ARM in Armidale, New South Wales
 2MFM in Sydney, New South Wales
 ABC Western Plains in Lightning Ridge, New South Wales
 Radio National in Lithgow, New South Wales
 7XS in Queenstown, Tasmania
 7THE in Hobart, Tasmania
 ABC Classic FM in Warrnambool, Victoria
 ABC NewsRadio in Albany, Western Australia
 6RTR in Perth, Western Australia

Barbados
BBC World Service

Canada (Channel 221)
 CBHY-FM in Yarmouth, Nova Scotia
 CBIS-FM in Sydney, Nova Scotia
 CBNX-FM in St. Vincent's, Newfoundland and Labrador
 CBRI-FM in Etzikom, Alberta
 CBTC-FM in McBride, British Columbia
 CBU-FM-1 in Victoria, British Columbia
 CBXO-FM in Ocean Falls, British Columbia
 CFCC-FM in Guyer, Quebec
 CFFC-FM in Fox Creek, Alberta
 CFGA-FM in Brisay, Quebec
 CFGR-FM in Kangiqsualujjuaq, Quebec
 CFMM-FM-1 in Waskesiu Lake, Saskatchewan
 CFNR-FM in Terrace, British Columbia
 CFVD-FM-2 in Pohenegamook, Quebec
 CFVD-FM-3 in Squatec, Quebec
 CHMX-FM in Regina, Saskatchewan
 CHOD-FM in Cornwall, Ontario
 CHPL-FM in Plamondon, Alberta
 CIHO-FM-2 in Baie St-Paul, Quebec
 CITI-FM in Winnipeg, Manitoba
 CJAY-FM in Calgary, Alberta
 CJDM-FM in Drummondville, Quebec
 CJOZ-FM in Bonavista, Newfoundland and Labrador
 CJQQ-FM in Timmins, Ontario
 CJSC-FM in Campement Sarcelle, Quebec
 CJTI-FM in Temagami, Ontario
 CKKX-FM-1 in Manning, Alberta
 CKLA-FM in La Crete, Alberta
 CKPC-FM in Brantford, Ontario
 CKVM-1-FM in Temiscaming, Quebec
 CKYL-FM-2 in High Prairie, Alberta
 VF2239 in Parent, Quebec
 VF2450 in Voisey Bay, Newfoundland and Labrador
 VF2473 in Fraser Lake, British Columbia
 VF2562 in Shellbrook, Saskatchewan
 VF2564 in Princeton, British Columbia
 VF8011 in St-Georges-de-Beauce, Quebec

China 
 CNR Music Radio in Wenzhou

Japan
 RBCi Radio in Naha, Okinawa

Kosovo
92.1 Capital FM in Drenica, Gllogoc

Malaysia
 Ai FM in Ipoh, Perak
 Johor FM in Eastern Johor
 Nasional FM in Sandakan, Sabah

Mexico
 XHACD-FM in Acapulco, Guerrero
 XHANZ-FM in Manzanillo, Colima
 XHAZN-FM in Apatzingán, Michoacán
 XHFO-FM in Mexico City
 XHGBO-FM in General Bravo, Nuevo León
 XHGML-FM in Guamúchil, Sonora
 XHHC-FM in Ensenada, Baja California
 XHITD-FM in Durango, Durango
 XHMYL-FM in Mérida, Yucatán
 XHOBS-FM in Ciudad Obregón, Sonora
 XHOJF-FM in Ocotlán de Morelos, Oaxaca
 XHPEDL-FM in Ciudad Delicias, Chihuahua
 XHPEFQ-FM in Saltillo, Coahuila
 XHPG-FM in Córdoba, Veracruz
 XHPMAZ-FM in Mazatlán, Sinaloa
 XHPUV-FM in Putla de Guerrero, Oaxaca
 XHSI-FM in Santiago Ixcuintla, Nayarit
 XHSMA-FM in San Miguel Allende, Guanajuato
 XHUX-FM in Tepic, Nayarit
 XHZTA-FM in Zihuatanejo, Guerrero

Tonga
China Radio International

United Kingdom
Wirral Radio in Wirral, England
BBC Radio 3 in Haslingden, England
BBC Radio 3 in Ivybridge, England
BBC Radio 3 in Olivers Mount, England
BBC Radio 3 in Tafton Hill, England
BBC Radio 3 in Woodchurch, England
BBC Radio 3 in Glasgow, Scotland
BBC Radio 3 in Wenvoe, Wales
BBC Three Counties Radio in Bedmond, England

United States (Channel 221)
 KAGR-LP in Arapahoe, Nebraska
 KARJ in Escondido, California
  in Carlsbad, New Mexico
  in Houston, Alaska
 KCAF-FM in Kenedy, Texas
 KCCA-LP in Anthony, Kansas
  in Cherokee, Iowa
  in Green Valley, Arizona
  in Colville, Washington
  in Dixon, Missouri
 KCWB in Byron, Wyoming
 KCZO in Carrizo Springs, Texas
 KDQN-FM in De Queen, Arkansas
  in Green River, Wyoming
  in Marlow, Oklahoma
 KGDL in Trent, Texas
 KHOS-FM in Sonora, Texas
  in Clinton, Arkansas
  in Bonners Ferry, Idaho
 KIDG in Pocatello, Idaho
  in Castle Rock, Colorado
 KKCM in Thermal, California
  in Walnut Creek, California
 KKOZ-FM in Ava, Missouri
  in Moreauville, Louisiana
 KLQP in Madison, Minnesota
  in Centralia, Missouri
  in Butler, Missouri
  in Seneca, Kansas
 KNBT in New Braunfels, Texas
 KOPY-FM in Alice, Texas
 KORN-FM in Parkston, South Dakota
  in Bakersfield, California
 KPVC-LP in Dallas, Texas
 KQCM in Joshua Tree, California
 KQKZ in Bakersfield, California
  in Fayetteville, Arkansas
 KRAT in Sparks, Nevada
 KRDA in Clovis, California
  in Belleville, Kansas
 KRLS in Knoxville, Iowa
 KROI in Seabrook, Texas
 KRUE in Waseca, Minnesota
 KRWR in Tyler, Texas
  in Pago Pago, American Samoa
  in Reedsport, Oregon
 KSYR in Benton, Louisiana
  in Broken Arrow, Oklahoma
  in Payson, Utah
  in Glen Rose, Texas
  in La Junta, Colorado
  in De Quincy, Louisiana
 KULD-LP in Laredo, Texas
 KUMA-FM in Pilot Rock, Oregon
 KUOS-LP in Sedona, Arizona
 KUUU in Tooele, Utah
 KVCL-FM in Winnfield, Louisiana
 KVMX-FM in Placerville, California
 KWJD-LP in Onalaska, Washington
 KWVR-FM in Enterprise, Oregon
  in Cedar City, Utah
 KXDE-LP in Denton, Texas
  in Farmersville, Texas
 KXJO in St. Maries, Idaho
 KXWR-LP in Tsaile, Arizona
  in Hutto, Texas
 KZBX-LP in Williams, Arizona
  in Fort Dodge, Iowa
  in Dickinson, North Dakota
  in Holbrook, Arizona
  in Immokalee, Florida
  in Hampton, South Carolina
  in Pleasant City, Ohio
 WBKN in Brookhaven, Mississippi
  in Muncie, Indiana
  in Carrollton, Georgia
  in Carlisle, Kentucky
  in Mechanicsville, Virginia
 WCFJ in Irmo, South Carolina
  in Hornell, New York
  in Hillsdale, Michigan
 WCTQ in Venice, Florida
  in Adel, Georgia
 WDER-FM in Peterborough, New Hampshire
  in Clinchco, Virginia
  in Walton, New York
 WECQ in Destin, Florida
 WEMQ-LP in Horsham, Pennsylvania
  in Minor Hill, Tennessee
 WFOV-LP in Flint, Michigan
  in Freeport, Illinois
  in Grand Haven, Michigan
 WGYT-LP in Greer, South Carolina
 WHBT-FM in Moyock, North Carolina
  in Vienna, Georgia
  in Dowagiac, Michigan
 WIDL in Cass City, Michigan
 WIKG in Mercersburg, Pennsylvania
  in Jackson, Georgia
  in Johnstown, Pennsylvania
 WJJN (FM) in Columbia, Alabama
  in Hattiesburg, Mississippi
 WJNS-FM in Yazoo City, Mississippi
 WJPL-LP in Barre, Vermont
  in Macclenny, Florida
 WKHL in Palmyra, Pennsylvania
  in Ellwood City, Pennsylvania
  in Cullman, Alabama
  in Merigold, Mississippi
  in Fredonia, Kentucky
  in Fenwick Island, Delaware
 WLHR-FM in Lavonia, Georgia
 WLNG in Sag Harbor, New York
  in Manitowoc, Wisconsin
  in Menomonie, Wisconsin
  in Blackduck, Minnesota
  in Morganton, North Carolina
  in Derby Center, Vermont
  in Starkville, Mississippi
 WMYB in Myrtle Beach, South Carolina
  in Perry, Florida
 WNKU-LP in Covington, Kentucky
  in Bellevue, Ohio
  in Baldwinsville, New York
  in Provincetown, Massachusetts
  in Louisville, Georgia
  in Pittsburgh, Pennsylvania
 WQFM in Nanticoke, Pennsylvania
 WQKQ in Dallas City, Illinois
  in Goodlettsville, Tennessee
  in Saint Johns, Michigan
 WRJC-FM in Mauston, Wisconsin
  in Poughkeepsie, New York
  in Rochester, Indiana
  in West Carrollton, Ohio
 WRSV in Elm City, North Carolina
 WSGJ-LP in Bowling Green, Kentucky
 WSQV in Lock Haven, Pennsylvania
 WSVQ-LP in Charleston West Side, West Virginia
  in Tompkinsville, Kentucky
 WTWS in Harrison, Michigan
 WUMS in University, Mississippi
  in Presque Isle, Maine
  in Vineland, New Jersey
 WVTK in Port Henry, New York
 WVTY in Racine, Wisconsin
  in Buckhannon, West Virginia
 WWPE-FM in Hermantown, Minnesota
 WWBJ-LP in Hillsboro, Ohio
  in Charleston, Illinois
 WXEX-FM in Sanford, Maine
 WXPS-LP in Spartanburg, South Carolina
 WXXM in Sun Prairie, Wisconsin
 WYAS (FM) in Luquillo, Puerto Rico
  in Little Falls, Minnesota
  in Middleport, Ohio
  in Vincennes, Indiana
 WZDV in Amherst, New York
  in Hormigueros, Puerto Rico
  in Fairhope, Alabama
 WZZR in West Palm Beach, Florida

Vietnam
 Bac Ninh Radio in Bắc Ninh Province

References

Lists of radio stations by frequency